Cedarburg Bog is a bog located in Ozaukee County, Wisconsin owned by the Wisconsin Department of Natural Resources and the University of Wisconsin–Milwaukee. It is the largest intact wetland complex in southeastern Wisconsin. The bog is a refuge and habitat for several species of plantlife and wildlife. It was designated a Wisconsin State Natural Area in 1952 and a National Natural Landmark in 1973. Additionally, it is part of the National Experimental Ecological Reserve Network.

Photos

References

Protected areas of Ozaukee County, Wisconsin
National Natural Landmarks in Wisconsin
University of Wisconsin–Milwaukee
Bogs of Wisconsin
Landforms of Ozaukee County, Wisconsin
State Natural Areas of Wisconsin